Harald Mannl (1904–1961) was German actor of film, radio and television. He also directed two films for DEFA in East Germany in the mid-1950s, and acted in others, before returning to West Germany.

Filmography

References

Bibliography
 Feinstein, Joshua Isaac . The Triumph of the Ordinary: Depictions of Daily Life in the East German Cinema 1956–1966. Stanford University, 1995.

External links

1904 births
1961 deaths
German male film actors
German male television actors
People from Dresden